The 1969 World Table Tennis Championships women's singles was the 30th edition of the women's singles championship.
Toshiko Kowada defeated Gabriele Geissler in the final by three sets to one, to win the title.

Results

See also
List of World Table Tennis Championships medalists

References

-
1969 in women's table tennis
Table